Nematabramis is a genus of cyprinid freshwater fish that occur in Borneo and the Philippines.  There are currently five described species in this genus.

Species
 Nematabramis alestes (Seale & B. A. Bean, 1907)
 Nematabramis borneensis Inger & P. K. Chin, 1962
 Nematabramis everetti Boulenger, 1894
 Nematabramis steindachnerii Popta, 1905
 Nematabramis verecundus Herre, 1924

References
 

 
Fish of Asia
Ray-finned fish genera